Here Is My Heart is a 1934 American musical comedy film directed by Frank Tuttle and starring Bing Crosby, Kitty Carlisle, and Roland Young. It is based on the play La Grande-duchesse et le garçon d'étage by Alfred Savoir.

Plot
A famous singer pretends to be a penniless waiter to get close to the woman of his dreams, a European princess.

Cast
 Bing Crosby as J. (Jasper) Paul Jones
 Kitty Carlisle as Princess Alexandra
 Roland Young as Prince Nicholas / Nicki
 Alison Skipworth as Countess Rostova
 Reginald Owen as Prince Vladimir / Vova
 William Frawley as James Smith
 Marian Mansfield as Claire
 Cecilia Parker as Suzette, the Maid
 Akim Tamiroff as Manager of Hotel
 Arthur Housman as Drunken Waiter
 Charles Arnt as Higgins, Paul's Valet
 Charles C. Wilson as Captain

Production
Filming commenced in Hollywood at the end of August 1934 and was completed early in November.

Reception
The critics liked the film, with The New York Times saying, "...the new Bing Crosby film at the Paramount is a witty, lyrical and debonair farce, and a first-rate addition to the holiday bounties... Mr. Crosby, who has already shown that his talents include a gift for light comedy, emerges this time as a celebrated songbird who, having made his way in the world, decides to take his million dollars and satisfy all the frustrated ambitions which he had brooded over as a boy. “Here Is My Heart” is a bright and funny entertainment, deftly produced and happily performed."

Variety praised it as well: "A setup for the Crosby fans and an excellent example of musical comedy picture making. "Here Is My Heart" should have an easy time of it most anywhere. Crosby is in fine voice, the songs he was handed are honies, and the story serves nicely as something to hang the singing and the songs on... To change the pace the director has him singing while doing anything but hanging from a chandelier. One well planned departure has Crosby in a duet with his own voice playing on a phonograph."

Soundtrack
 "June in January" (Ralph Rainger and Leo Robin) by Bing Crosby
 "With Every Breath I Take" (Ralph Rainger and Leo Robin) by Bing Crosby and Kitty Carlisle
 "Love Is Just Around the Corner" (Lewis E. Gensler and Leo Robin) by Bing Crosby and Cecilia Parker
Crosby also recorded the songs for Decca Records. All three of them enjoyed success, particularly "June in January". His songs were also included in the Bing's Hollywood series.

See also 
 The Grand Duchess and the Waiter (1926)

References

External links
 

1934 films
1934 musical comedy films
American musical comedy films
American black-and-white films
1930s English-language films
Films directed by Frank Tuttle
Paramount Pictures films
American films based on plays
Remakes of American films
Sound film remakes of silent films
1930s American films